Colonial elections were held in South Australia from 9 March to 3 April 1860. All 36 seats in the South Australian House of Assembly were up for election.

In the three years after the 1857 election, there were four different governments. Three came and went in the first year of responsible government. The Finniss government was replaced by John Baker (the first leader of a government from the Legislative Council), then by Robert Richard Torrens, and by Richard Hanson, the last forming the fourth government in a period of only seven months. Hanson’s government took the Assembly into the 1860 election. There was also instability in the membership. There were 14 by-elections held during the life of the parliament.

Since the inaugural 1857 election, no parties or solid groupings had been formed, which resulted in frequent changes of the Premier. If for any reason the incumbent Premier of South Australia lost sufficient support through a successful motion of no confidence at any time on the floor of the house, he would tender his resignation to the Governor of South Australia, which would result in another member deemed to have the support of the House of Assembly being sworn in by the Governor as the next Premier.

Informal groupings began and increased government stability occurred from the 1887 election. The United Labor Party would be formed in 1891, while the National Defence League would be formed later in the same year.

See also
Premier of South Australia

Notes

References
History of South Australian elections 1857-2006, volume 1: ECSA
Statistical Record of the Legislature 1836-2007: SA Parliament

Elections in South Australia
1860 elections in Australia
1860s in South Australia
March 1860 events
April 1860 events